Yaron Traub ( born 1964) is an Israeli conductor and pianist. He was born in Tel Aviv.

Traub was Music Director and Chief Conductor of the Valencia Orchestra from 2005 to 2017. Throughout the 1990s he served as Daniel Barenboim's assistant at the Bayreuth Festival and the Chicago Symphony Orchestra. Since winning the 1998 Orchestral Prize at the IV Kondrashin International Conducting Competition in Amsterdam, Traub has conducted numerous symphonic orchestras worldwide.

Yaron Traub is the son of Chaim Taub, former concertmaster of the Israel Philharmonic Orchestra.

{| class="wikitable"
|-
! !! Orchestra !! Position !! Preceded by... !! App. !! Left !! Succeeded by... 
|-
||  || Chicago Symphony Orchestra || Assistant Conductor ||  || 1995 || 1998 ||
|-
|| || || Associate Conductor || || 1998 || 1999 ||
|-
||  || The Israel Sinfonietta Beersheba || Principal Conductor, Artistic Director ||  || 2002 || 2005 ||
|-
||  || Orquesta de Valencia || Principal Conductor, Artistic Director ||  || 2005 || 2017 ||
|-
|}

References

External links

Articles on Yaron Traub in El País 

Israeli conductors (music)
1964 births
Living people
21st-century conductors (music)